VTV Binh Dien Long An is a Vietnamese women's volleyball team from Long An, Vietnam. The club was founded in 1986 and plays in the Vietnam League

History
The start of the club's women's volleyball team Long An Textile was established in 1986, promoted teams since 1990 to the present, has 7 times the team standing in the first 3 national ranking (successive phase from 1993 to 1999). When Long An Textile Company difficulty in production and business, volleyball teams were also affected, but the potential of the team is great.

In 2002, the squad rejuvenation. Currently, members of the team have an average height is 1m74, and the average age is 20.75. National team has 2 members of the team. August 26, 2004 at the Department of Sport Long An, Binh Dien Fertilizer Company has signed a contract with the Department to negotiate on the receiving team and rename the Binh Dien volleyball team - Long An.

On 16 September 2004, the opening ceremony was held volleyball team at the Center for Cultural & Information Long An Province. According to many experts, the investment capacity of Binh Dien Fertilizer Company, the team will return to the top in the next few years.

Current squad
As of March 2022
 Heach Coach:  Lê Thái Bình
 Assistant Coach:  Nguyễn Thanh Hưng

Main team

Young team
As of July 2022
 Heach Coach:  Nguyễn Thị Ngọc Hoa
 Assistant Coach: Trần Thanh Danh, Huỳnh Kim Anh Thư

Loan players

Honours

Domestic competitions
Vietnam League 
 Winners : 2009, 2011, 2017, 2018
  Runner-up: 2007, 2014
  3rd place: 2008, 2010, 2012, 2015, 2016, 2022
 4th place: 2006, 2019

Hung Vuong Cup - Final Round 1 
  Winners : 2005, 2015, 2018, 2019, 2021
  Runner-up: 2007, 2009, 2011, 2017
  3rd place: 2010, 2012, 2016

Hoa Lu Cup  
  Winners : 2008, 2021, 2022

VTV Cup 
4 appearances: 2007 (9th), 2009 (5th), 2010 (4th), 2011 (9th)

MHB Cup - VTV9  Binh Dien Cup 
  Winners : 2007, 2010
  Runner-up: 2006, 2008, 2012, 2014, 2017
  3rd place: 2016, 2018
 4th place: 2015, 2019

 Vietnam Volleyball Super Cup 
  Winners : 2009, 2011, 2016
  Runner-up: 2014, 2017, 2018
 3rd place: 2015

 LienVietPostBank Cup 
  Runner-up: 2014, 2017
 3rd place: 2013, 2019

Vietnam National Games
  Winners : 2018
  Runners-up : 2006, 2010, 2014, 2022

Vietnam League (defunct)
  Winners: 1993, 1997
  Runners-up: 1995, 1998, 1999
  3rd place: 1992, 1994, 1996

Youth competitions
 Vietnam Youth Volleyball Championship
  Winners :  2009, 2010, 2012, 2013, 2018, 2022
  Runners-up: 2014, 2017, 2019, 2020
  3rd place: 2015, 2016

 Vietnam Youth Volleyball Club Championship
  Winners : 2011, 2015, 2017, 2018
  Runners-up: 2014, 2019, 2020, 2022
  3rd place: 2012, 2016

Vietnam U-23 Volleyball Championship 
  3rd place: 2020

International competitions
 Asian Club Championship 4 appearances 
 2010 —  7th place
 2012 — 5th place
 2018 — 7th place
 2019 — 7th place

 Kor Royal Cup (Thailand)
 2018 —  Runner-up

Coach
  Lương Nguyễn Ngọc Hiền
  Nguyễn Quốc Vũ
  Nguyễn Văn Hải
  Lương Khương Thượng
  Kittipong Pornchartyingcheep
  Vương Quân
  Shimizu Mikihiro

Notable players

Domestic players

 Ngô Thị Vàng
 Nguyễn Thị Hộ
 Nguyễn Thị Hoa
 Nguyễn Thị Kim Thoa
 Nguyễn Thị Thúy
 Trịnh Thị Thu Dung
 Phạm Thị Bé Tư
 Huỳnh Kim Anh Thư
 Trần Thị Cẩm Thúy
 Nguyễn Thị Ánh Hoa
 Lâm Thị Thu Sáu
 Lê Thị Bích Liên
 Đinh Thị Diệu Châu
 Nguyễn Thị Nhung
 Nguyễn Thị Kiều Oanh
 Lương Thu Phương
 Nguyễn Thị Thu Nhiên
 Dương Thị Nhàn
 Lê Thị Ánh Nguyệt
 Lê Thị Mỹ Nga
 Võ Thị Kim Đính
 H'Mia Eban
 Hà Ngọc Diễm
 Đoàn Thị Khen
 Nguyễn Thị Trinh
 Nguyễn Thị Thanh Diệu
 Trương Thụy Anh Phương
 Đinh Thị Trà Giang
 Nguyễn Thị Hồng Đào
 Nguyễn Thị Ngọc Hoa
 Phạm Thu Hà
 Nguyễn Thị Bích Tuyền
 Dương Thị Hên
 Lữ Thị Phương
 Nguyễn Thị Bích Trâm
 Nguyễn Hoàng Ánh Ngọc
 Huỳnh Thị Hồng Nhung
 Trần Thị Tuyết Hoa
 Nguyễn Thị Kim Liên
 Đào Thị Nhung
 Phạm Thị Cẩm Linh

Foreign players
 
 Jutarat Montripila
 Em-orn Phanusit
 Amporn Hyapha
 Narumon Khanan
 Wilavan Apinyapong
 
 Anna Senni Seniloli
 
Aleksandra Terzić

References

External links
 
 VTV Binh Dien Cup

Vietnamese volleyball clubs
Volleyball in Vietnam
Volleyball clubs established in 1986
Sports clubs in Vietnam
1986 establishments in Vietnam